Radiant Office is a 2017 South Korean television series starring Go Ah-sung and Ha Seok-jin. The series is written by a rookie screenwriter who won the 2016 MBC TV Drama Screenplay Competition in Miniseries category. It aired on MBC from March 15 to May 4, 2017 on Wednesdays and Thursdays at 22:00 (KST) for 16 episodes.

Synopsis 
Eun Ho-won faces repeat rejections in her job search until despair drives her to attempt suicide. At the hospital, she learns she might be terminally-ill, but then at the same time, she also finally succeeds in getting hired. Thinking she has nothing to lose, she tackles her job and life with new perspectives. Her superior at work, Seo Woo-jin, considers her a pain in the neck. They become a bickering pair.

Cast

Main characters
Go Ah-sung as Eun Ho-won
 A 28-year-old woman who never succeed at getting a steady job. Tired and sick of her life and multiple part-time jobs she does, she tries to commit suicide. She gets both happy and sad news at the same time. That she might be terminally-ill but also finally succeeds in getting hired as a contractual employee. Thinking she has nothing to lose, she tackles her job and life with new perspectives and bolder attitude.
Ha Seok-jin as Seo Woo-jin
 A 38-year-old man who is the Head of Marketing team. He is an elite workaholic with perfect qualifications and work results. But he has uncompromising personality and sharp tongue, which often makes him at odds with his coworkers.  
Lee Dong-hwi as Do Ki-taek
 A 32-year-old man who has been failed to pass national civil service exam a few times, which resulted in him lacking professional work experience. Despite being abandoned by his materialistic girlfriend, he is still a romanticist at heart.
Kim Dong-wook as Seo Hyun
 A 34-year-old emergency physician, he was the one who takes care of Ho-won when she was brought to the hospital after her attempted suicide. He keep tabs on her ever since and after he knows she works at his family's company, he becomes her secret guardian.
Hoya as Jang Kang-ho
 A 28-year-old man who comes from a wealthy family in Gangnam. He has received the best education and upbringing that money can buy. Unfortunately, he suffers from panic disorder, which resulted in multiple failures of job interviews.

Supporting characters
Kwon Hae-hyo as Park Sang-man
Kim Byung-choon as Heo Gu-dong
Jang Shin-young as Jo Seok-kyung
Oh Dae-hwan as Lee Yong-jae
Han Sun-hwa as Ha Ji-na
Kim Yu-mi as Lee Hyo-ri
Kim Hee-chan as Oh Jae-min
FeelDog as Eun Ho-jae
Choi Beom-ho as Seo Tae-woo
Lee Yoon-sang as Han Jung-tae
Park Se-wan as Lee Kkot-bi
Im Ye-jin as Mrs. Eun
 Shin Dong-mi as Jo Seok-kyung's ex-husband's fiancée

Ratings 
 In the table below, the blue numbers represent the lowest ratings and the red numbers represent the highest ratings.
 NR denotes that the drama did not rank in the top 20 daily programs on that date.

Awards and nominations

Original soundtrack

Part 1

Part 2

Part 3

Part 4

Part 5

Part 6

Part 7

International broadcast
 In Vietnam: Danet.vn & FPT Play (streaming online 3 hours after Korea)
In Peru: the series aired on August 28, 2018 at 6:50 pm

References

External links
Radiant Office official MBC website 

2017 South Korean television series debuts
MBC TV television dramas
Korean-language television shows
South Korean romantic comedy television series
2017 South Korean television series endings